The 1999 Mid-American Conference baseball tournament took place in May 1999. The top three regular season finishers from each division met in the double-elimination tournament held at Ball Diamond on the campus of Ball State University in Muncie, Indiana. This was the eleventh Mid-American Conference postseason tournament to determine a champion. The top seed from the west, won their second consecutive, and second overall, tournament championship to earn the conference's automatic bid to the 1999 NCAA Division I baseball tournament.

Seeding and format 
The top three finishers in each division, based on conference winning percentage only, participated in the tournament. The top seed in each division played the third seed from the opposite division in the first round. The teams played double-elimination tournament. This was the second year of the six team tournament.

Results 

* - Indicates game was suspended after 8 innings due to weather.

All-Tournament Team 
The following players were named to the All-Tournament Team.

Most Valuable Player 
Sean Ryan won the Tournament Most Valuable Player award. Ryan played for Bowling Green.

References 

Tournament
Mid-American Conference Baseball Tournament
Mid-American Conference baseball tournament
Mid-American Conference baseball tournament